2012 JEF United Chiba season.

J2 League

References

External links
 J.League official site

JEF United Chiba
JEF United Chiba seasons